Trinitodexia is a genus of tachinid flies in the family Trinitodexia.

Distribution
Trinidad and Tobago.

Species
Trinitodexia mellisquama Townsend, 1935

References

Monotypic Brachycera genera
Diptera of North America
Dexiinae
Tachinidae genera
Taxa named by Charles Henry Tyler Townsend